Las Trancas is a village and corregimiento in Guararé District, Los Santos Province, Panama with a population of 511 as of 2010. It lies between Las Tablas and Pedasí.  Its population as of 1990 was 605; its population as of 2000 was 525.  It is celebrated for its Festival de la Candelaria, a religious ceremony held on 2 February every year, with folk dancing and music.

References

Corregimientos of Los Santos Province